The Museum of Photographic Arts (MOPA) is a museum in San Diego's Balboa Park. First founded in 1974, MOPA opened in 1983. MOPA is one of three museums in the US dedicated exclusively to the collection and preservation of photography, with a mission to inspire, educate and engage the broadest possible audience through the presentation, collection, and preservation of photography, film and video. The museum's address is 1649 El Prado, San Diego, CA, 92101.

History
Arthur Ollman was the museum's first executive director. Deborah Klochko is the current (2013) executive director. In March 2000, the museum re-opened to the public after a twelve-month renovation project. It expanded its gallery space and added a classroom, a theater, a print viewing room and a 20,000-volume library.

Collection
Over the years, MOPA has collected thousands of photographs that currently reside in the museum’s permanent collection, which includes photographs that span the history of photography. It includes collections from film maker Lou Stoumen’s estate as well as the entire Nagasaki Journey: The Photographs of Yosuke Yamahata, August 10, 1945, by Yōsuke Yamahata.

References

Further reading

External links

 
 Public Domain photos from MOPA at Flickr

Museums in San Diego
Art museums and galleries in California
Photography museums and galleries in the United States
Institutions accredited by the American Alliance of Museums
Art museums established in 1983
Museum of Photographic Arts
Museum of Photographic Arts